Manabat is a surname. Notable people with the surname include:

 Nick Manabat (1972–1995), Filipino comics artist
 Xyriel Manabat (born 2004), Filipina actress

Kapampangan-language surnames